George Jeffrey "Jeff" Norman (born 6 February 1945 in Leigh, Lancashire) is a male British long-distance, cross country and fell runner.

Athletics career
He won the Three Peaks Race six times between 1970 and 1975 setting a course record in 1974. He competed in the 1976 Summer Olympics in the men's marathon.

Norman holds the British 50 km track record, which he set on 7 June 1980 in Timperley with a time of 2:48:06. He also formerly held the British road record for the same distance, having run a time of 2:53:21 on 23 February 1985 in Douglas, Isle of Man.

He represented England in the marathon, at the 1978 Commonwealth Games in Edmonton, Alberta, Canada.

Competition record

References

External links
 Jeff Norman at Association of Road Running Statisticians
 British Movietone on YouTube: 1972 Three Peaks Race, won by Jeff Norman

1945 births
Living people
Sportspeople from Leigh, Greater Manchester
Sportspeople from Wigan
English male marathon runners
British fell runners
Olympic athletes of Great Britain
Athletes (track and field) at the 1976 Summer Olympics
Athletes (track and field) at the 1978 Commonwealth Games
Commonwealth Games competitors for England